Eumimesis affinis is a species of beetle in the family Cerambycidae. It was described by Magno and Monné in 1990. It is found in Brazil and Ecuador.

References

Calliini
Beetles described in 1990